The 2002 Belgian Grand Prix was a Formula One motor race held at Spa-Francorchamps on 1 September 2002. It was the fourteenth race of the 2002 FIA Formula One World Championship.

The race was won by Michael Schumacher, driving a Ferrari. Schumacher took pole position, led the whole race except during the pit stops, and set the fastest race lap. With the win, he became the first driver to win ten Formula One Grands Prix in a single season, surpassing the record jointly held by himself and Nigel Mansell. Team-mate Rubens Barrichello finished second, with Juan Pablo Montoya third in a Williams-BMW.

Two months after the race, it was announced that the Belgian Grand Prix would not be held in  due to a row over tobacco advertising.

Classification

Qualifying

Race

Championship standings after the race 
Bold text indicates the World Champions.

Drivers' Championship standings

Constructors' Championship standings

References

Belgian Grand Prix
Belgian Grand Prix
Grand Prix
Belgian Grand Prix